Paris and Milan (女王本色) is a Singaporean Chinese comedy-satire variety show which aired on Channel 8 in 2009. Relevant issues such as the 2009 flu pandemic, "choping" and the local education system debates are parodied in the form of skits and scenarios which are fully filmed outdoors.

Main characters
Paris (Patricia Mok)
Milan (Michelle Tay)
Aunty Lucy (Dennis Chew)
Lily (Patricia Mok)
Atun (Michelle Tay)
"Ah beng" (Ben Yeo)
Madam Chin (Michelle Tay)
Wang Meimei (Ben Yeo)
C C Yeo (Ben Yeo)
Teochew Uncle (Dennis Chew)
Beatrice (Dennis Chew)
Zhou Dudu (Dennis Chew)
Miss Ai-Yo-Yo (see Chen Liping) (Dennis Chew)

Cast
Dennis Chew
Patricia Mok
Michelle Tay
Ben Yeo

Critical reception
Dennis Chew's character Aunty Lucy was extremely well received by audiences. Previously, Chew was mostly known for being one of YES 933's most popular DJs but the popularity of the character further exposed him to television audiences.

Star Awards Nominations 2010

References

External links
Xinmsn (Former Official Website)
Mewatch (Current Official Website)

Singaporean comedy television series
2009 Singaporean television series debuts
2009 Singaporean television series endings
Channel 8 (Singapore) original programming